Putney Methodist Church is a Grade II listed church at Upper Richmond Road, Putney, London SW15 6SN.

It was built in 1881 in a Gothic style.

References

Buildings and structures in the London Borough of Wandsworth
Grade II listed churches in London
Churches in the London Borough of Wandsworth
Putney